Mitsou Annie Marie Gélinas (born September 1, 1970, in Loretteville, Quebec) is a Canadian pop singer, businesswoman, television and radio host, and actress. She is credited as Mitsou Gélinas when acting, but records simply as Mitsou (the French spelling of Mitsu, which means honey in Japanese).

Biography
Born in Loretteville, Quebec, Mitsou is the granddaughter of Quebec actor and playwright Gratien Gélinas. She got involved in acting and modelling as a child notably in the French-Canadian soap opera Terre humaine, but also began to pursue singing in her teenage years.

In 1988, she signed with Canadian independent Isba Records and released her first single, "Bye Bye Mon Cowboy" (composed and produced by Jean-Pierre Isaac), which became a pop hit across Canada, an extremely rare feat for a francophone song, in 1989. Later that year, she followed with her debut, multicultural-themed album, El Mundo which also spawned the singles "La Corrida" and "Les Chinois".

In 1990, she released her follow-up album, Terre des hommes. Ivan Doroschuk of Men Without Hats wrote the title track, in addition to her first English-language song "A Funny Place (The World Is)". The first single, "Mademoiselle Anne", failed to replicate her cross-Canada success, but in 1991 the second single, "Dis-moi, dis-moi", put Mitsou back in the spotlight with a controversial video that showed her and several male and female models nude in a shower room.

The video, which was released only a few months after Madonna's "Justify My Love", was banned from regular rotation by MuchMusic as the Madonna video had been – technically, the video was not fully banned from the network, as the programming committee ruled that the late-night program City Limits was allowed to play it, but as a mainstream pop song incompatible with the show's alternative rock format, the program refused to do so.

Notably, the video for "Dis-moi, dis-moi" was not banned on Much's French-language sister station MusiquePlus, but in fact was placed in heavy rotation; Mitsou's manager Pierre Gendron attributed the difference to English Canada being more prudish than Quebec.

Having banned two high-profile pop videos within a few months of each other, MuchMusic created a new occasional late-night series, Too Much 4 Much, on which they would play banned videos along with forum and panel discussions on the controversies these videos raised. Due to the controversy, Mitsou's single was played across Canada even though the lyrics (which Mitsou co-wrote) were exclusively in French.

Her 1992 follow-up EP, Heading West, was a collection of past hits and new material in English and French. Despite a title track co-written by Cyndi Lauper, and the radio and video play given the dance-driven single "Deep Kiss", it failed to generate a substantial pop hit. In 1993, she followed it up with her first full-English album Tempted. Although the lead single was written by RuPaul ("Everybody Say Love"), the album again failed to give her a significant hit. The video for "Everybody Say Love" featured nudity (as well as homosexuality) but failed to stir any media attention.

Subsequently, she returned to recording primarily French-language material for her 1994 album Ya Ya (with the track "Ya Ya" a Lee Dorsey cover) which included cover versions of songs popular in Quebec in the '60s and '70s, such as the title track and "Comme j'ai toujours envie d'aimer" (a Marc Hamilton cover). She also released a Christmas album entitled Noel in 1995 that included some Quebec holiday classics.

After a hiatus, her next album, Mitsou (Éponyme) (1999), featured hip-hop-influenced beats and a street-oriented rock sound. She also co-wrote and co-produced all the tracks. A club-oriented EP Vibe followed in 2002. It features remixes of previous material such as "Bye Bye Mon Cowboy" (which was re-recorded and released as a single) and "Money Penny".

Other achievements
Mitsou acted in a number of Quebec films, most recently in Denys Arcand's Academy Award-winning Les invasions barbares. She was top billed in 1992's Coyote, which was a major release in Quebec (released during her popularity as a singer, she was billed as simply Mitsou for this release). She wrote the song "Le Toucher" for the film The Bone Collector.

In 2000, Mitsou joined C't’encore drôle, the morning show on Énergie 94.3 FM in Montreal. She was an instant hit, as evidenced by the show's high ratings and enormous popularity with 18- to 34-year-olds who have made it the number one morning show for 10 years straight.  By June 15, 2012, Mitsou left the morning show of the station after 12 years. On August 20, 2012, Gélinas revealed that she signed on to join the rival CFGL-FM as the drive home co-host but won't begin her duties until November.

Since 2001 she has been the editor of a Quebec magazine for young women, Clin d'oeil. In 2005, she hosted the show Au Courant on CBC Newsworld, an English-language program that focuses on "what's hot and happening in French Canada."

In February 2009, it was announced that Mitsou would become the "beauty ambassador" for Lise Watier, a Canadian-based cosmetics and skincare product line, and would subsequently appear in the company's advertising campaigns.

In 2009, she hosted Comment va ta famille?, a documentary series that portrays the state of the family in Quebec in 2008–09, and television magazine La liste, produced by Marie-France Bazzo for ARTV. She also joined the cast of The Child Prodigy (L'Enfant prodige), a movie about pianist André Mathieu, in which she played Vivianne Jobin, one of Mathieu's mistresses.

In fall 2009, she began serving as a presenter for the TV program Kampaï! À votre santé, a show on healthy cooking and dining, for Radio-Canada.

In August 2010, Mitsou married her partner of 15 years, Iohann Martin, in a "surprise wedding" that he had organized without her knowledge for her 40th birthday.  They are the parents of two daughters.

Mitsou will begin releasing new singles via her website as the inspiration strikes her. The first of these is a collaboration between Mitsou and Creature entitle "On vole", and was released in 2011.

In 2021 she appeared as a guest judge in a second season episode of Canada's Drag Race. Her 1993 single "Everybody Say Love", originally written by RuPaul, was used as the Lip Sync for Your Life number.

Discography

Albums
 El Mundo (Isba) 1988 (Platinum)
 Terre des Hommes (Isba) 1990 (Gold)
 Heading West (Isba) 1992
 Mitsou (Hollywood Records) 1992 (U.S. compilation)
 Tempted (TOX) 1993
 Ya Ya (TOX) 1994
 Noël (TOX) 1995
 La Collection (Unidisc) 1997 (compilation)
 Mitsou (Dazmo) 1999
 Vibe EP (Dazmo) 2002

Singles
 "Bye Bye mon Cowboy" (Isba) (1988) Canada No. 63 / Québec No. 1 (6 weeks)
 "Les Chinois" (Isba) (1989) Québec No. 2
 "La Corrida" (Isba) (1989)
 "Mademoiselle Anne" (Isba) (1990)
 "Dis-moi, dis-moi" (Isba) (1991) Canada No. 63
 "Lettre à un Cowboy" (Isba) (1991) Québec No. 1
 "A Funny Place (The World Is)" (Isba) (1991)
 "Deep Kiss" (Isba) (1992)
 "Heading West" (Isba) (1992)
 "Everybody Say Love" (1993)
 "Le Yaya" (1994)
 "Comme j'ai toujours envie d'aimer" (1994)
 "Ouvre-moi" (1999)
 "Si tu m'aimes encore" (1999)
 "Les Ronces" (1999)
 "La Vie Sera" (1999)
 "A Toi (You and I)" (2002)
 "Bye Bye Mon Cowboy (vibe mix)" (2002)
 "Mon Roi" (2002)
 "On vole" (2011)

See also
List of Quebec musicians
Music of Quebec
Culture of Quebec

References

External links
Official site

Fan site
Interview with Mitsou
 Genealogy : Mitsou

1970 births
Actresses from Quebec City
Canadian dance musicians
Canadian film actresses
French-language singers of Canada
French Quebecers
Living people
Musicians from Quebec City
Canadian women pop singers
20th-century Canadian women singers
21st-century Canadian women singers